Transfer cells are specialized parenchyma cells that have an increased surface area, due to infoldings of the plasma membrane. They facilitate the transport of sugars from a sugar source, mainly mature leaves, to a sugar sink, often developing leaves or fruits. They are found in nectaries of flowers and some carnivorous plants.
Transfer cells are specially found in plants in the region of absorption or secretion of nutrients.

The term transfer cell was coined by B. E. S. Gunning and J. S. Pate. Their presence is generally  correlated with the existence of extensive solute influxes across the plasma membrane.

References

Plant cells